Saqlain Mushtaq, a former Pakistani cricketer, took 19 five-wicket hauls during his career in international cricket. A five-wicket haul (also known as a "five–for" or "fifer") refers to a bowler taking five or more wickets in a single innings. This is regarded by cricket critics as a notable achievement, and fewer than 50 bowlers have taken more than 15 five-wicket hauls at international level in their cricketing careers. A right-arm off break bowler who represented his country between 1995 and 2004, Saqlain was described by the BBC as "a revolution in the art of attacking off-spin bowling". Saqlain was named by Wisden as one of their Cricketers of the Year in 2000.

Saqlain made his Test debut in 1995 against Sri Lanka at the Arbab Niaz Stadium, Peshawar. His first Test five-wicket haul came in 1997 against the same team at the R. Premadasa Stadium, Colombo. In January 1999 against India at the M.A. Chidambaram Stadium, Chennai, he took a five-wicket haul in both innings of a Test match for the first time. He repeated this feat only once more in his career, at the Feroz Shah Kotla Ground, Delhi during the second Test of the same series. His career-best figures for an innings were 8 wickets for 164 runs against England at the Gaddafi Stadium, Lahore in November 2000. He took ten or more wickets in a match on three occasions.

Having made his One Day International (ODI) debut in September 1995 against Sri Lanka at the Jinnah Stadium, Gujranwala, Saqlain's first ODI five-wicket haul came the following year, against New Zealand, a match Pakistan won at the same venue. His career-best bowling figures in ODI cricket were 5 wickets for 20 runs against England at the Rawalpindi Cricket Stadium in 2000. , Saqlain is one of the four bowlers to achieve an ODI hat-trick (three wickets in consecutive deliveries) on two or more different occasions, both against Zimbabwe; one of his hat-tricks came during the 1999 Cricket World Cup. Saqlain took thirteen five-wicket hauls in Test cricket and six in ODIs. , he is fourth in the list of five-wicket haul takers for Pakistan, all formats of the game combined.

Key

Tests

One Day Internationals

Notes

References

External links
 
 
 

Mushtaq
Saqlain Mushtaq